Don Joaquín Francisco Pacheco y Gutiérrez-Calderón (22 February 1808 – 8 October 1865) also known as El Pontífice (The Pontiff), was a Spanish politician and writer who served as Prime Minister of Spain in 1847 and held other important offices such as Minister of State. He was also the 3rd Attorney General of Spain.

Biography

Early life
On 22 February 1808, Pacheco was born in Écija as son to a notary of the city council. He studied humanities at Asunción College in Córdoba and in 1823 went to the University of Seville, where he studied jurisprudence, obtaining his bachelor’s degree in law in 1829. There developed a lifelong friendship with fellow student, Juan Donoso Cortés. They both frequented the political and literary circles.

Journalism
In 1832, he moved to Madrid working as a lawyer. It was at this time he had literary and journalistic inclinations, founding the newspaper La Abeja in 1834. He also collaborated with other newspapers such as El Artista and El Español.

In the world of law, with Juan Bravo Murillo, he founded El Boletín de Jurisprudencia y Legislación. In 1844, he held the chair of Constitutional Political Law at the Ateneo de Madrid, previously holding those of Legislation (1836–1838) and Criminal Law (1839–1840).

Political career
Pacheco was a liberal, being a member of the Moderate Party since 1834, and in 1840 declaring before parliament,

From 1837 to 1858, he held a seat in the Congress of Deputies, representing the Province of Córdoba. In 1858, he was elected senator.

On 28 March 1847, he was appointed prime minister, a position he held for 5 months. His management was limited to retaining office as the Cortes Generales held an opposing majority and he received the animosity of the king consort, Francisco de Asis as well as the royal clique. He returned to the Spanish Government as Minister of State, with Baldomero Espartero in 1854, and Alejandro Mon in 1864.

He served as ambassador to Mexico from 1860 until his expulsion in January 1861. Upon his arrival in Veracruz City, he traveled to Mexico City, at the time occupied by Miguel Miramón, to present his status. He recognized Miramón, lending him prestige. Public opinion was negative towards Pacheco and when the capital returned to federal forces in 1861, he received an order of expulsion, certified by Benito Juárez, from the Secretary of State and Foreign Relations on 12 January.

He was also ambassador to London (1856), Rome (1854 and 1864), as well as France, prosecutor of the Supreme Court (1843 and 1847), a member of the Royal Spanish Academy, Royal Academy of History, Royal Academy of Moral and Political Sciences, and the Royal Academy of Fine Arts. He was elected president of the Royal Academy of Jurisprudence and Legislation, as well as the Royal Academy of Fine Arts in 1865, being unable to serve in the latter case.

On 8 October 1865, Pacheco died as a part of the 1863–1875 cholera pandemic.

Works

Poems
Catón (1828)

A la señora doña... (1831)

Oda a la amnistía (1833), a neoclassical poem

Una noche (1833)

Meditación (1834)

Travel Book
Italia (1857)

Theater
Alfredo (1835), a romantic drama

Los Infantes de Lara (1836), a historical drama

Bernardo del Carpio (1848), a drama

History
“Historia de las Cortes de 1837” (1839), in Madrid Magazine

References

|-

|-

|-

|-

1808 births
1865 deaths
People from Écija
Moderate Party (Spain) politicians
19th-century Spanish politicians
19th-century Spanish lawyers
Prime Ministers of Spain
Foreign ministers of Spain
Members of the Congress of Deputies (Spain)
Members of the Senate of Spain
Politicians from Andalusia
Ambassadors of Spain to France
Ambassadors of Spain to Mexico
Members of the Royal Spanish Academy
Attorneys general of Spain
Prosecutors general of Spain